Kathakali is a 2016 Indian Tamil-language action mystery thriller film directed by Pandiraj. It stars Vishal, who also co-produced the film with Pandiraj, and Catherine Tresa.

Kathakali was released on 14 January 2016, where it received praise for Vishal's performance, action sequences, direction and musical score.

Plot 
After spending 6 years in the US, Amudhan returns to Cuddalore for his marriage to his long-time girlfriend Meenu Kutty, where he is forced to invite to his marriage a local gangster named Lakshmipathy aka Thamba, despite a previous history between them. Thamba was responsible for dragging Amudhan and his elder brother Gnanavel Rajarathinam to prison five years ago on a false charges after Gnanavel, who worked in Thamba's fishing business, decided to leave Thamba and start his own fishing business. Thamba was also responsible for chopping off the leg of Amudhan and Gnanavel's father Rajarathinam when he had tried to intervene in the fight between Thamba and his sons, confining him to a wheelchair. To escape from Thamba and his gang and not cause any more harm to his family, Amudhan had emigrated to the US.

While Amudhan is in Chennai doing wedding shopping with Meenu Kutty, he gets the news that Thamba had been killed the previous day. Unfortunately for Amudhan, he is soon suspected of murdering Thamba due to their enmity. Thamba's henchmen set Amudhan's house on fire, forcing Gnanavel and his family to go into hiding. Saravana Vadivel a cruel and merciless Inspector, is assigned to bring Thamba's killer to justice. Since Amudhan is the prime suspect, Vadivel orders him to present himself at Cuddalore and prove his innocence, failing which he will be considered as Thamba's murderer and will be thrown into prison. Amudhan leaves for Cuddalore at midnight, with policemen heavily guarding the bus and route in which he is travelling to prevent him from escaping. Amudhan manages to escape from the police at Puducherry and meets up with Gnanavel and his family. 

Amudhan and Gnanavel then leave for Cuddalore to meet Vadivel. They soon find out that Vadivel has no intention of hearing their story and is determined to throw them into prison where they escape from Vadivel and the police. Meenu Kutty is forced to sit in the police station by Vadivel as he hopes that Amudhan will take the blame for the murder to protect his fiancé. While on the run, Amudhan finds out that Vadivel is behind Thamba's death. He then overpowers Thamba's brothers-in-law and Vadivel, as well as his teenage son, and holds them hostage to find out the truth. Vadivel had been humiliated in front of his wife by Thamba, because of which he had decided to take revenge on Thamba by sending men to kill him and then framing his death on Amudhan, since he seemed easy to frame and also because of the history between Thamba and Amudhan. 

Amudhan confronts Vadivel, forcing him to reveal that he was Thamba's murderer. However, it is revealed that Thamba's brother-in-laws were also involved in the murder as they wanted to usurp Thamba's position. They then fight with Amudhan, with one of the brother-in-law's get killed by his own man by accident. Vadivel is also brutally attacked by Amudhan. Unfortunately for Vadivel and the other brother-in-law, Thamba's teenage son overheard their confession regarding the murder. Enraged, Thamba's son kills both his uncle and Vadivel with a metal silencer. Amudhan narrates in a voice-over that even though Vadivel and Thamba's in-laws had plotted to kill Thamba. Amudhan, who was determined to take revenge against Thamba for the atrocities committed against him and his family, had stabbed Thamba and escaped before Vadivel's men arrived and further stabbed a dying Thamba to death.

Cast

Soundtrack 

The film's soundtrack album and background score were composed by Hiphop Tamizha and Papelan Veerasingam. The soundtrack album consisted of four tracks and was released on 24 December 2015. This is Hiphop Tamizha's second collaboration with Vishal after Aambala.

Reception 
The album won positive reviews from both critics and audiences.
Behindwoods rated the album 2.5 out of 5.
Sify rated the album 3/5, stating "After a roaring ‘Thani Oruvan’, Hiphop Thamizha plays to the gallery of the movie here by sticking to the movie's demands. A romantic number, a kuthu number & couple of theme music pieces make the album crisp & to the point".

Release 
Kathakali was released on 14 January 2016 alongside Rajini Murugan, Gethu and Tharai Thappattai as one of the Pongal releases. The satellite rights of the film were sold to Sun TV. A Hindi dubbed version titled Khel Power Ka was also released in 2017 via Zee Cinema.

Critical reception 
The film received positive reviews from critics. Baradwaj Rangan of The Hindu called it a "fairly watchable thriller" where "Two things help. One, the two-hour running time. Two, the focus." M Suganth of The Times of India rated the film 3 out of 5 and stated, "What is refreshing about Kathakali is that it is less an action film and more a mystery", adding, "It is in the final portions that the film slips a bit. Given that Amudhavel is played by Vishal, the character has to be an action hero and so, we see him beating up professional gangsters with hardly any effort, and the film starts to resemble conventional action films." Indiaglitz gave it a 2.8/5 saying that "[It] is a good entertainer that slowly builds into an action packed thriller."

References

External links 
 

2016 films
2010s Tamil-language films
2016 action thriller films
Indian action thriller films
Films about murder
Films scored by Hiphop Tamizha
Films directed by Pandiraj